is a Japanese manga series written and illustrated by . The series began serialization in Kodansha's Young Magazine the 3rd magazine in September 2014 and was later transferred to Monthly Young Magazine in 2021 before finishing serialization in 2022, and is being published in English by Kodansha USA. An anime television series adaptation by A-1 Pictures aired between January and March 2017.

Plot
The story takes place in an age where demi-humans, more casually known as "demis", have slowly started to become accepted into human society. Tetsuo Takahashi is a biology teacher who ends up teaching three such demis, hoping to understand more about them while also managing to catch their attention.

Characters
 
 
 A biology teacher who is fascinated by demis and wants to learn more about them. He is occasionally referred to as "Iron Man" by his students, a pun on his bulky physique and his name. As he learns about demis, he starts to understand the problems they face, both as teenagers and demis, and strives to help them in any way he can. Takahashi is often the girls' go-to person due to his knowledge on demis and his kind and helpful nature. He has a guardian-like and caring relationship with the girls and is always looking after them for their well being.

A highly energetic vampire. She avoids biting other people's necks, instead drinking blood packs sent by the government and using blood substitutes like tomato juice. Contrary to myths, she loves eating garlic and merely dislikes bright lights and warm temperatures. Hikari has a twin sister, Himari who is human. Despite being the older twin, Hikari acts like the more child-like sister where as Himari is the more mature one. She occasionally has the urge to nibble on someone, usually her sister, to stop her teeth from itching. Despite her lackadaisical nature, she often strives to help others in need. Hikari's mother is a vampire and her father is a human. Hikari has a tendency to hang out in Tetsuo's biology room since it's cool and doesn't receive much sunlight. Her favorite food is liver and onions.

A shy dullahan whose head is separate from her body, which has a blue flame coming from where the neck should be. Since her arms are occupied carrying her head, which doesn't move on its own, she longs for contact with others (holding hands, hugs etc.) Kyōko develops a crush on Tetsuo, due to his kind and caring nature. She initially found it hard to make friends as people found it awkward to talk to her without bringing up her detached head in some way, despite her own acceptance of the concept and desire to joke about it. Incidentally, a medical procedure has proven she does possess a neck, which connects her mouth to her stomach and lungs, but somehow exists in "another space" and serves as a Wormhole between her head and body. After Hikari notes how awkward it must be for Kyōko to carry her head in one hand and school bag in the other to Tetsuo, he talks to the principal and the school allows Kyōko to wear a backpack for her convenience.

A timid snow woman whose body is always cold. She will sometimes spread cold air while experiencing negative emotions and is susceptible to heat. Yuki initially dislikes her demi nature, fearing that she could harm others or those around her, though Tetsuo manages to show her that the only things she can actually freeze are her tears and sweat. Hikari will often want to hug or hold onto Yuki due her cold body temperature since vampires don't manage well in the heat. Yuki also secretly a manga enthusiast and has a taste for multiple genres. After befriending Tetsuo, Hikari, and Kyōko, she begins to open up about herself and talk more.

A succubus who works as a math teacher. Succubi are also sometimes referred to as "Dream Demons". Due to the aphrodisiac effect her body produces, she constantly has to take precautions to avoid inadvertently seducing men and other male students, such as wearing a tracksuit to hide her body and taking the first and last train of the day to avoid crowds. If she falls asleep, she can accidentally give people within her vicinity erotic dreams. For this reason Sato lives alone away from civilization since she can't live in an apartment complex or any place where there may be a lot of people around. While Sakie's nature as a succubus leads males to become attracted to her, she herself develops a crush on Tetsuo after coming to believe he is immune to her aphrodisiac effect. After Sakie mentions her interest in Tetsuo to Ugaki, he points out that, contrary to what she had previously assumed, Tetsuo was actually affected by her aphrodisiac but had acted like he was not affected so as not to hurt Sakie's feelings. Regardless, she continues to develop an interest in him.

Hikari's younger twin sister, who is an ordinary human. She is much more serious than her sister, both as a person and a student. She often tries to make her sister act more mature, but is unable to. Himari is always looking after Hikari to make sure she doesn't get into trouble or stay out too late. She will often text Tetsuo to keep an eye on Hikari when she can't. She is also the one who has to do Hikari's hair every morning. Despite their constant bickering, they care about each other and have many similarities such as similar tastes in food and fashion.

Media

Manga
Written and illustrated by Petos, Interviews with Monster Girls was serialized in Kodansha's seinen manga magazine Young Magazine the 3rd from 5 September 2014 to 6 April 2021. The series was transferred to Monthly Young Magazine on 20 May 2021. The series ended on 19 December 2022.

In March 2016, Kodansha USA announced that they had licensed the series in North America.

A spin-off manga written by Kae Hoshimoto, illustrated by Hajime Honda, with supervision by Petos titled Occult-chan wa Katarenai launched in the February issue of Young Magazine the 3rd on 5 January 2019. The series is centered on Tetsuo's niece Yoko and her live-in spirit, Zashiko. The spin-off series also moved to Monthly Young Magazine on 20 May 2021, then later moved to the YanMaga Web website on 20 December 2021.

Interviews with Monster Girls

Anime
An anime television adaptation was announced on 3 September 2016. The anime is directed by Ryō Andō with animation by the studio A-1 Pictures. The series' scripts is written by Takao Yoshioka, character designs are done by Tetsuya Kawakami, and music is composed by Masaru Yokoyama. The series aired on Tokyo MX, MBS, and BS11 between 7 January 2017 and 25 March 2017. Crunchyroll simulcast the series as it aired while Funimation began releasing an English dub on 25 January 2017. A thirteenth episode aired on 29 June 2017.

Reception
As of September 2016, the series' three volumes had 550,000 copies in print. As of December 2016, the series had over 1.1 million copies in print.

Volume 2 ranked at number 13 on the Oricon manga charts during its first week, selling 39,876 copies. It dropped to number 14 for its second week, selling another 32,283 copies. Volume 3 ranked 21st, selling 55,907 copies in its first week.

Anime News Network editor Theron Martin published a positive review of the complete anime series in 2018. He gave praise to the loveable main cast (singling out both Tetsuo and Hikari as highlights), the story's attention to detail in its worldbuilding of the demis and adding a bit of philosophy when interacting with them, concluding that "Overall, Interviews with Monster Girls delivers an entertaining and occasionally thoughtful package that avoids the seedier pitfalls common to the monster girl genre."

Interviews with Monster Girls was nominated for Best Slice of Life in the 2017 Crunchyroll Anime Awards but lost to Girls' Last Tour.

Explanatory notes

References

External links
  at Young Magazine the 3rd 
  
 

2017 anime television series debuts
A-1 Pictures
Anime series based on manga
Comedy anime and manga
Crunchyroll anime
Fiction about monsters
Funimation
Japanese mythology in anime and manga
Kodansha manga
Mainichi Broadcasting System original programming
Manga adapted into television series
Mythology in anime and manga
School life in anime and manga
Seinen manga
Supernatural anime and manga
Tokyo MX original programming
Vampires in anime and manga